Iwaki General Gymnasium (岩城総合体育館) is an indoor sporting arena located in Iwaki, Yurihonjo, Akita, Japan.  It hosts indoor sporting events such as basketball and volleyball and is practice home to the Prestige International Aranmare Akita that will play in the Women's Japan Basketball League.

Facilities
Main arena - 1,360m2 （40m×34m）

See also 
 Yurihonjo Arena
 Matsugasaki Gymnasium

References 

Sports venues in Akita Prefecture
Indoor arenas in Japan
Basketball venues in Japan
Prestige International Aranmare Akita
Yurihonjō